Lying in States were an American indie rock band from Chicago, Illinois.

History
The group was founded in 1999, and began by touring the United States with groups such as Rainer Maria, Hot Hot Heat, Rye Coalition, and Denali. After releasing an EP in 2002, the group recorded its initial full-length at Semaphore Studios in Chicago, which was released on Flameshovel Records in January 2004. A follow-up LP was released in March 2006 and was accompanied by another US tour.

Members
Justin Trombly - bass
Fergus Kaiser - guitar
Ben Clarke - vocals, guitar
Mark Benson - drums
Jeremy Ohmes - keyboards

Discography
Bewildered Herd EP (Harmless Records, 2002)
Most Every Night (Flameshovel Records, 2004)
Wildfire on the Lake (Flameshovel Records, 2006)

References

External links
 Review

Indie rock musical groups from Illinois
Musical groups from Chicago
Musical groups established in 1999
Musical groups disestablished in 2006
1999 establishments in Illinois
2006 disestablishments in Illinois
Flameshovel Records artists